Richfield Ice Arena is an ice arena located in the city of Richfield, Minnesota.  The Arena offers skating lessons, skate rental, open skating and open hockey.  The Arena is the home rink for the Minnesota Whitecaps of the Premier Hockey Federation, Richfield High School and the Academy of Holy Angels High School. The Richfield Hockey Association coordinates the youth hockey program.

History
The original main Rink #1 built back in 1971 has seating for 1,400 spectators, and room for another 500 fans that can watch while standing.  Adjacent to Rink #1 is the newer Rink #2 which was added in 1999 to the arena and serves as more of a practice sheet of ice.  Rink 2 has only nominal seating for only 200 fans in steel bleachers.

Improvements
The City of Richfield plans to invest $2 million in the building, adding a locker room for the Whitecaps, expanding the lobby, adding classrooms and a training facility.

References

External links
Official Website

Sports venues in Minnesota
Buildings and structures in Hennepin County, Minnesota
Indoor ice hockey venues in Minneapolis–Saint Paul
1971 establishments in Minnesota
Sports venues completed in 1971